Sanaullah Khan (born 12 May 1978) is a Pakistani cricketer. He played in 27 first-class and 15 List A matches between 1998 and 2011. He made his Twenty20 debut on 25 April 2005, for Quetta Bears in the 2004–05 National Twenty20 Cup.

References

External links
 

1978 births
Living people
Pakistani cricketers
Quetta cricketers
Quetta Bears cricketers
Place of birth missing (living people)